The 2021 Generali Open Kitzbühel is a tennis tournament played on outdoor clay courts. It is the 77th edition of the Austrian Open Kitzbühel, and part of the World Tour 250 series of the 2021 ATP Tour. It will take place at the Tennis stadium Kitzbühel in Kitzbühel, Austria, from 24 through 31 July 2021.

Champions

Singles

  Casper Ruud def.  Pedro Martínez, 6–1, 4–6, 6–3.

Doubles

  Alexander Erler /  Lucas Miedler def.  Roman Jebavý /  Matwé Middelkoop, 7–5, 7–6(7–5)

Points and prize money

Point distribution

Prize money 

*per team

Singles main draw entrants

Seeds

 1 Rankings as of July 19, 2021.

Other entrants
The following players received wildcards into the singles main draw:
  Alexander Erler
  Dennis Novak
  Thiago Seyboth Wild

The following player received entry as an alternate:
  Arthur Rinderknech

The following player received entry as a special exempt:
  Daniel Altmaier

The following players received entry from the qualifying draw:
  Ernests Gulbis
  Jozef Kovalík
  Lukas Neumayer
  Holger Rune

The following players received entry as lucky losers:
  Carlos Taberner
  Mario Vilella Martínez

Withdrawals
Before the tournament
  Aljaž Bedene → replaced by  Carlos Taberner
  Richard Gasquet → replaced by  Mario Vilella Martínez
  Dušan Lajović → replaced by  Arthur Rinderknech
  Corentin Moutet → replaced by  Mikael Ymer
  Lorenzo Musetti → replaced by  Radu Albot
  Jo-Wilfried Tsonga → replaced by  Lucas Pouille

Doubles main draw entrants

Seeds 

 1 Rankings as of July 19, 2021.

Other entrants 
The following pairs received wildcards into the doubles main draw:
  Alexander Erler /  Lucas Miedler
  Neil Oberleitner /  Tristan-Samuel Weissborn

The following pair received entry using a protected ranking:
  Marc López /  Jaume Munar

Withdrawals
Before the tournament
  Sander Arends /  David Pel → replaced by  David Pel /  Arthur Rinderknech
  Ariel Behar /  Gonzalo Escobar → replaced by  Ariel Behar /  Guillermo Durán
  Pablo Cuevas /  Fabrice Martin → replaced by  Pablo Cuevas /  Thiago Seyboth Wild

References

External links
Official website 

Generali Open Kitzbuhel
Austrian Open Kitzbühel
Austrian Open
Generali Open Kitzbühel